The Grafton Express is an Australian passenger train operated by NSW TrainLink between Sydney and Grafton via the North Coast line.

In February 1990, the long-standing Holiday Coast XPT was axed as part of a restructure of CountryLink services. With the other XPT services struggling to keep up with weekend demand, in June 1990 a service to Grafton was reinstated. It ran on Fridays only to Grafton and Sundays only to Sydney but during school holidays ran daily. It was formed of locomotive hauled HUB/RUB stock with the headcode NL35/NL36.

Initially hauled by 86 class electric locomotives south of Broadmeadow, however from March 1992 it was hauled by diesel locomotives throughout usually a 442 class. The locomotive hauled Grafton Express last ran in November 1993.

With the National Party having lost a number of North Coast seats in the 1990 Federal election in a policy reversal it was announced that Xplorer railcars would be purchased to extend the Northern Tablelands Express with an XPT to be released to operate a daily service to Grafton. Thus in November 1993 the Grafton XPT began, a service that continues today.

References

Named passenger trains of New South Wales
Passenger rail transport in New South Wales
Railway services introduced in 1990
1990 establishments in Australia